The Datsun 210 name is used to describe a few different Nissan automobiles from 1959 until 1982:

 1957–1959 — The internal code for what was to become the long-running Nissan Bluebird nameplate. Usually marketed as the Datsun 1000 or 1200, various versions received the chassis codes 114, 115, and 211, although "210" is the most commonly used name to describe this series of cars.
 1973–1978 — The third generation Nissan Sunny subcompact carried the B210 chassis code and was sold as the Datsun B210 in North America
 1978–1982 — For model years 1979 through 1982, the fourth generation Sunny (B310) was sold as the Datsun 210 in North America

Subcompact cars
Cars introduced in 1957
Cars introduced in 1973
210